José Antonio Barrios (born 11 November 1948) is a Spanish former footballer and football manager. He competed in the men's tournament at the 1968 Summer Olympics.

Career
Born in Tenerife, Barrios began playing football with local side CD Tenerife. Known as el Tigre, he made his senior debut for the club during the 1966–67 Segunda División season. Ahead of the 1968–69 La Liga season, Barrios was transferred to Granada CF, where he would play for four seasons. Manager Rinus Michels brought Barrios to FC Barcelona for the 1972–73 La Liga season, and Barrios led the club with twelve goals. However, the following season, Barcelona brought in Johan Cruyff and Barrios became a reserve forward as the club won its first La Liga title in ten years.

Barrios was then transferred to Hércules CF, where he would become the club's all-time leading goal-scorer in La Liga, with 35 goals in 115 league matches over four seasons. After his success with Hércules, Barrios moved to Levante UD for the 1979–79 Segunda B División season. He led Levante to promotion to the Segunda División before returning to his home town club Tenerife, now playing the Segunda B. A season later, Barrios finished his playing career at UD Orotava.

References

External links

 

1948 births
Living people
CD Tenerife players
Granada CF footballers
FC Barcelona players
Hércules CF players
Levante UD footballers
Spanish footballers
Olympic footballers of Spain
Footballers at the 1968 Summer Olympics
People from Tenerife
Sportspeople from the Province of Santa Cruz de Tenerife
Association football forwards
Footballers from the Canary Islands